Tim Clark (born June 5, 1959) is a retired American soccer defender who played professionally in the North American Soccer League and the Major Indoor Soccer League.

Youth
Clark played youth soccer with the Busch Soccer Club.  He graduated from St. Louis University High School where he was an All State high school soccer player.  He then attended Southern Illinois University at Edwardsville, playing on the men's soccer team from 1977 to 1979.  His senior season, Clark and his team mates won the NCAA Men's Division I Soccer Championship.  Clark was named the Tournament MVP.

Professional
In 1980, Clark turned professional with the Minnesota Kicks of the North American Soccer League.  After two seasons with the Kicks, Clark turned to indoor soccer with the Philadelphia Fever of the Major Indoor Soccer League.  On June 16, 1982, the Kansas City Comets purchased Clark's contract from the Fever.  Clark remained with the Comets until waived on June 3, 1987.

References

External links
NASL/MISL stats
Blue Valley Soccer Club bio

1959 births
Living people
Soccer players from St. Louis 
American soccer players
Kansas City Comets (original MISL) players
Major Indoor Soccer League (1978–1992) players
Minnesota Kicks players
North American Soccer League (1968–1984) players
North American Soccer League (1968–1984) indoor players
Philadelphia Fever (MISL) players
SIU Edwardsville Cougars men's soccer players
Association football defenders